Rokicie may refer to the following places:
Rokicie, Płock County in Masovian Voivodeship (east-central Poland)
Rokicie, Sierpc County in Masovian Voivodeship (east-central Poland)
Rokicie, West Pomeranian Voivodeship (north-west Poland)